The Oxford Shul is situated in Riviera, Johannesburg, near the suburbs of Saxonwold, Houghton and Killarney. It has been in existence for over 70 years.

The Synagogue provides regular services, morning and evening (seven days a week). It is a venue used for marriages, Bar-Mitzvahs and other life cycle ceremonies. The Synagogue also provides adult education and special services for children, youth and seniors in addition to cultural and social activities.

The spiritual leadership is provided by Rabbi Yossi Chaikin, who has serviced the congregation since 2000. He delivers sermons and numerous shiurim (religious lessons).

Services on Shabbat (Friday night and Saturday morning) and all major holidays are led by Chazan Tzvi Gudelsky. He is accompanied by the Oxford Shul Choir under the direction of Choirmaster Bryan Isakow.

The synagogue publishes a monthly newsletter, which is sent to all member families and is also available online. “The Oxfordian” is a weekly pamphlet, replete with synagogue news. The synagogue also keeps its congregation informed of events via an sms service. Information about past and future events can also be found on Facebook.

The synagogue campus stretches over several acres of land.

The main sanctuary, which seats 1600, is the largest in Africa. Services take place in the main sanctuary every Shabbat (Friday night and Saturday morning) and on major Jewish holidays. The main sanctuary is also used for marriage ceremonies.

A smaller synagogue on the campus is used for all morning and evening services during the rest of the week.

The gardens in front of the synagogue are used for marriages and other events

The synagogue boasts a youth centre, with rooms dedicated for the children to play and for the teenagers to spend time and an adventure jungle gym. A nursery school uses part of those premises during weekdays.

History

The First Twenty Five Years (1943-1968)  
Although it was in the year 1942 during the dark years of World War II that a band of devoted men first met in prayer in the Oxford area, it was in the year 1943 that the Oxford Synagogue was founded. Negotiations for the presently developed two-acre site at a purchase price of £15,000 was in progress, and a deputation of founding members received the blessing of the United Hebrew Congregation to proceed with the purchase.

At a special General Meeting of the United Hebrew Congregation in 1944 the Oxford Synagogue was finally incorporated within the orbit of the United Hebrew Congregation, as a third constituent Synagogue. In the following year the first High Festival Services were held in the large Tudor House, by then partly converted into a small synagogue accommodating 400 congregants.

In November of the same year a Dedication Service was held with the then Chief Rabbi Rabinowitz officiating, who at the same time inducted the late Rev. W. Yesorsky, appointed in succession to Rev. B. Schechter who served the Congregation as Minister, Teacher, etc.

Rev. Yesorsky and his family occupied the rest of this large house until mid-1947, when he was succeeded by Rev. J. Rozowski. The former owner, Mrs. Davis, had conducted a Nursery School in the converted stables, but as soon as the property was purchased in 1944 the Oxford Hebrew-English Nursery School was established in its place.

Five years later, in 1949, building operations on the Hall commenced. This Hall was then used as a Synagogue to accommodate 800 worshippers.

In 1954, two extra acres of land adjacent to the Synagogue property and facing Riviera Road were purchased. In the following year Dr. H. Abt was appointed as Minister to fill the vacancy left by the departure of Rabbi Singer, who had occupied the pulpit for seven years.

In 1958 Cantor Kraus was appointed, in succession to Cantor Propis. In 1960 Rev. J. H. Mirkin was appointed as Second Reader in succession to Rev. J. Rozowski.

In the same year the present Nursery School and the double-storey Education block specially designed to cater for Hebrew classes under the United Hebrew Schools, was consecrated in an open-air ceremony by the then Chief Rabbi Rabinowitz and Dr. Abt. Foundation stones now in various parts of the complex and plaques were unveiled, commemorating those closely associated with the Community scheme. In August 1961 the foundation stone to the Synagogue proper was laid by the late Hon. Justice S M. Kuper and the foundation stone to the small Synagogue by Chief Rabbi Rabinowitz.

The official opening of the Synagogue took place in August 1962, when the late Honourable F. H. Odendaal, Administrator of the Transvaal, addressed the Congregation, followed by a small function in the Music Room.

In 1963 at a Banquet the reconstructed Hall was named by the late Justice Greenberg “The Simon Kuper Hall” in signal honour to the memory of a worthy member of the Congregation. The newly appointed Chief Rabbi B. M. Casper and his wife graced that great occasion with their presence.

In 1964, the architects of our Centre, Messrs. S. A. Abramowitch, Pinshow and Schneider, received an Award of Merit from the Transvaal Provincial Institute of Architects for the best Ecclesiastical building erected in the Transvaal from 1954 to 1964.

The Ladies’ Guild Room was furnished out of funds that had been collected at a fête many years back, and the Minor Hall was redecorated for small functions.

In 1965, Rabbi N. M. Bernhard accepted a call to our Synagogue. In 1966, Rabbi Bernhard started the Menorah Primary School as a branch of the Yeshiva College.

The same year, Mr. Solly Grusd headed a special committee to establish an Extension Synagogue for the High Holidays in the Simon Kuper Hall, and this step boosted the membership roll to some 2000 members.

During the Six-Day War in June 1967, our Synagogue-Centre became one of the largest Donor Stations for the Magen David Adom, and the Headquarters of the Israeli Emergency Appeal in this area.

Early 1968 saw the establishment of B’not Oxford, a group of young women, whose programme included religious, cultural and Zionist activities. Its activities have since extended to include assistance in Kosher catering and charitable projects and is making a worthwhile contribution to the Centre as a whole.

Past Chairmen

Personalities

The Rabbi  
Rabbi Yossi Chaikin was born in Copenhagen, Denmark. He spent his Primary and High School years in Brussels, Belgium and thereafter studied in Yeshivot in Belgium and the United States

He moved to South Africa in 1986 to be the Director of Activities at Chabad House in Johannesburg (then situated in Yeoville). In 1988 he accepted the call of the Constantia Hebrew Congregation in the Cape Peninsula to become their spiritual leader. At the same time he also held the position of Vice-Principal and Head of Department of Jewish Studies at Herzlia Constantia Primary School (on whose campus the shul is located).

He assumed the position of Rav of the Oxford Synagogue in 2000. He also teaches at the Torah Academy School in Johannesburg.

Rabbi Chaikin is married to Rivky (née Bacher) of Johannesburg.

The Chazan 
Tzvi Gudelsky is the chazan at Oxford Synagogue.

The Choirmaster
The Chazan is accompanied by the Oxford Shul Choir under the direction of Choirmaster Bryan Isakow.

Membership 
Membership is available from the Oxford Shul Membership page, by phoning Oxford Shul or visiting in person.

Full Membership 
Full members are entitled to all the benefits the Shul offers. They are also entitled to permanent seats in the Shul, which includes the High Holidays. You are added to the Shul's mailing list, and receive regular communications from the Shul, including a monthly newsletter. All the members personal details are entered into their database, so that they can notify members of upcoming Yartzeits, and so that their personal simchas and other important events can be noted in the newsletters.

Associate Membership 
Associate members are entitled to the same benefits as full members, with the exception of seats for the High Holidays. It is intended for members of other Synagogues, who wish to have additional membership at Oxford as well.

References 

Jews and Judaism in Johannesburg
Jewish organisations based in South Africa
Religious buildings and structures in Johannesburg
Synagogues in South Africa
Jewish organizations established in 1943